The Democratic Revolutionary Peoples Party (DRPP) was a political party in the Indian state of Manipur. The party launched 23 candidates in the state assembly elections in 2002, out of whom two were elected - N. Biren Singh and Thokchom Meinya.

In total, the party received 51,916 votes. Post-elections, the party joined the Secular Progressive Front led by the Indian National Congress (INC) in Manipur. Ahead of the 2004 Lok Sabha elections, the DRPP merged with the INC.

References 

Defunct political parties in Manipur
Political parties established in 2002
2002 establishments in Manipur